Sverrir Þór Sverrisson (born 23 May 1975) is an Icelandic basketball coach and former player for the Icelandic national basketball team. He previously coached Keflavík women's team where he won the national championship in 2017.

As a coach he has won the Icelandic women's championship three times and the men's national championship once.

Coaching career
Sverrir retired from top level play in 2010 and took over as head coach of Njarðvík women's team. He led them to the national championship in 2012. In January 2016, Sverrir was hired as the head coach of Úrvalsdeild kvenna club Keflavík, replacing Margrét Sturlaugsdóttir. He led the club to victory in the Icelandic Basketball Cup on February 11, 2017, and to the national championship on April 26 the same year.

On April 5, 2018, Sverrir was hired as the head coach of Keflavík men's team.

He unexpectedly resigned from Keflavík in May 2019.

Icelandic national team

Playing career
Between 2002 and 2003, Sverrir played eight games for the Icelandic national team.

Coaching
Sverrir was hired as the head coach of the Icelandic women's national basketball team in 2012. He led the team to second-place finish in the 2013 Games of the Small States of Europe. Sverrir resigned in 2014 with one year left on his contract after finding out the Icelandic Basketball Federation was actively looking for his replacement.

On 25 February 2022, Sverrir was hired as the head coach of Grindavík, replacing recently fired Daníel Guðmundsson.

In June 2022, he was hired as an assistant coach to Keflavík men's team.

Awards, titles and accomplishments

Individual awards

As player
Úrvalsdeild karla Defensive Player of the Year (2): 2003, 2004
Úrvalsdeild karla Young Player of the Year: 1994
Úrvalsdeild karla Sportmanship Award: 1993

As coach
Úrvalsdeild karla Coach of the Year: 2013
Úrvalsdeild kvenna Coach of the Year: 2012

Titles

As player
Icelandic men's champion (3): 2003, 2004, 2005
Icelandic Basketball Cup (2): 2003, 2004
Icelandic Supercup (3): 1995, 2003, 2008
Icelandic Company Cup (3): 2000, 2003, 2007

As coach
Icelandic men's champion: 2013
Icelandic women's champion (3): 2005, 2012, 2017
Icelandic Men's Basketball Cup: 2014
Icelandic Women's Basketball Cup (3): 2012, 2017, 2018
Icelandic Men's Basketball Supercup (2): 2012, 2013
Icelandic Women's Basketball Supercup (3): 2004, 2005, 2017
Icelandic Women's Company Cup: 2004

References

Sverrisson, Sverrir Thor
Sverrisson, Sverrir Thor
Icelandic basketball coaches
Icelandic men's basketball players
Úrvalsdeild karla (basketball) coaches
Úrvalsdeild karla (basketball) players
Úrvalsdeild kvenna basketball coaches
Grindavík men's basketball coaches
Grindavík women's basketball coaches
Keflavík men's basketball players
Keflavík men's basketball coaches
Keflavík women's basketball coaches
Njarðvík men's basketball players
Njarðvík women's basketball coaches
Ungmennafélagið Tindastóll men's basketball players
Snæfell men's basketball players